Andreyevskaya is a rural locality (a village) in Devyatinskoye Rural Settlement, Vytegorsky District, Vologda Oblast, Russia. The population was 51 as of 2002.

Geography 
Andreyevskaya is located 25 km southeast of Vytegra (the district's administrative centre) by road. Veliky Dvor is the nearest rural locality.

References 

Rural localities in Vytegorsky District